Ain M'lila Airfield is an abandoned World War II military airfield in Algeria, located approximately 17 km north-northwest of Aïn Kercha in Oum el Bouaghi province, about 50 km south-southeast of Constantine.  It was built by the Army Corps of Engineers on a flat, dry lakebed at an altitude of 2580 feet, designed for heavy bomber use by the United States Army Air Force Twelfth Air Force during the North African Campaign with concrete runways, hardstands and taxiways. Billeting and support facilities consisted of tents.  Due to its high altitude, the days were hot and the nights cold.  Known units which operated from Ain M'lila were:
 2d Bombardment Group, 17 June-31 July 1943, B-17 Flying Fortress
 301st Bombardment Group, 17 January - 6 March 1943, B-17 Flying Fortress
 321st Bombardment Group, 12 March-1 June 1943, B-25 Mitchell

The Americans pulled out in the summer of 1943, heading to their new bases around Foggia, Italy and Ain M'lila was abandoned.  The engineers dismantled what they could and the airfield was reclaimed by the desert.   Today only faint traces can be seen on aerial photography.

See also
 Boeing B-17 Flying Fortress airfields in the Mediterranean Theater of Operations
 Milano, Algeria

References

 Maurer, Maurer. Air Force Combat Units of World War II. Maxwell AFB, Alabama: Office of Air Force History, 1983. .
 
 USAFHRA search for Ain M'lila Airfield

Airfields of the United States Army Air Forces in Algeria
Airports established in 1942
1942 establishments in Algeria
1943 disestablishments in Algeria